Kal Manja is a 2011 India Kannada-language film starring Komal Kumar and Udhayathara in the lead roles alongside Aishwarya Nag. The film is a remake of the Malayalam hit Chathikkatha Chanthu. The film has been directed and written by Ramesh Prabhakaran and produced by Komal's wife Anasuya under his home banner. Emil Mohammed has composed the music.

Plot
The story revolves around a film unit which help the two estranged lovers unite.

Cast
 Komal Kumar as Kal Manja
 Aishwarya Nag as Indra
 Udhayathara as Vasumathi
 Guruprasad
 Sharan
 Thriller Manju
 Srinivasa Murthy
 Ramesh Bhat
 Killer Venkatesh

Reception

Critical response 

Shruti Indira Lakshminarayana from Rediff.com scored the film at 3 out of 5 stars and says "Actresses Udayathara and Aishwarya Nag have significant roles too. Udayathara comes out with a decent performance. Songs by Emil are easy on the ears. One of his compositions goes Komal mastu Kamalu... and we gladly agree. The film comes with a good story laced with humour. There are lots of twists and turns and this keeps you hooked through and through. For two and a half hours of pure comedy, watch Kal Manja". B S Srivani from Deccan Herald wrote "The screenplay keeps one enticed with the promise of something memorable, but only just. Kavi Urs’s work leaves much to be desired. But the story and Udayatara’s competent performance make meeting Kal Manja an enjoyable experience". A critic from The New Indian Express wrote "Ishwarya Nag is beautiful but stoic throughout the movie. Thriller Manju, Raju Talikote, Sharan and Guru Prasad have provided good support.Emil has provided good music. Songs are good. It is worth watching only if you can put up with slow narration during the post-intermission session". A critic from The Times of India scored the film at 3.5 out of 5 stars and wrote "Udayatara and Aishwarya Nag could have done a much better job.While dialogues by Rajendra Karanth have done justice to the script, music by Emil and cinematography by T Kaviarasu are not appealing".

Soundtrack
The music of the film was composed by Emil Mohammed and lyricists were as mentioned in the soundtrack details.

References

External links
 Kal Manja songs

2011 films
Kannada remakes of Malayalam films
2010s Kannada-language films